Uneeq Sokopeti Lisi Alena Palavi is a Tongan Australian netballer who has represented Tonga internationally.

Palavi was born in Melbourne, Australia to a Samoan mother and Tongan father. She played for the Werribee Centrals, the Victorian Fury, and the City West Falcons. In 2022 she was selected for the Collingwood Magpies.

She was selected for the Tonga national netball team for the 2019 Pacific Games in Apia. In 2022 she was selected for the team for the 2022 Pacific Australia Netball Series, where she shared the series MVP award with captain Hulita Veve and won the Grand Final MVP Medal. Later that year she was in the team for the 2023 Netball World Cup Oceania qualifiers, where she was top-scorer.

References

Living people
People from Melbourne
Australian sportspeople of Tongan descent
Australian netball players
Collingwood Magpies Netball players
Tongan netball players
Victorian Fury players
Year of birth missing (living people)